Trinity Lutheran Church, previously known as St. John's Episcopal Church, is a historic church at 702 N. Main Street in Rutherfordton, Rutherford County, North Carolina.

The Greek Revival-style church building was constructed in 1846 for the parish of St. John's Episcopal Church and remained an Episcopal church until 1936, when it was purchased by the Lutheran Synod and became Trinity Lutheran Church. The building was added to the National Register of Historic Places in 1972. The building suffered a damaging fire in 2011 and is currently closed.

References

Lutheran churches in North Carolina
Episcopal church buildings in North Carolina
Churches on the National Register of Historic Places in North Carolina
Religious buildings and structures completed in 1846
Greek Revival church buildings in North Carolina
Churches in Rutherford County, North Carolina
National Register of Historic Places in Rutherford County, North Carolina
Rutherfordton, North Carolina